Nada Es Lo Que Crees is the fourth album of Spanish singer Natalia. It features the singles: "Loco Por Mí", "A Ti" and "No Fui Yo". It crept up to number 24 in the Spanish charts, and "Loco Por Mi" managed to get to number 1 in the Spanish charts on download sales alone.

Personnel 
Natalia - lead and backing vocals
Da Bruk - production, arrangement, programmations, backing vocals
Alicia Arguiñano - backing vocals
Miguel Antelo - backing vocals
David Augustave - backing vocals
Nalaya - backing vocals
Norykko - backing vocals
Dany Reus - backing vocals and backing vocals direction
Gregory Carrero - guitar
Ernesto Teruel - bass
Raúl Gama - Hammond organ, clavichord, piano, string arrangement
Bruno Nicolás - producer, recording
Kiko Rodríguez - producer, recording
Felipe Guevara - mixing
Soren Elonsson - mastering
Rubendario - photography
Francesc Freixes - graphic design

References

2006 albums
Spanish-language albums